Mitch Horowitz (born November 23, 1965) is an American writer in occult and esoteric themes.  He is the former editor-in-chief of TarcherPerigee. A frequent writer and speaker on religion and metaphysics in print and on television, radio, and online, Horowitz’s writing has appeared in The New York Times, The Washington Post, The Wall Street Journal, Time, and CNN.com, and he has appeared on NPR, CBS News, NBC News, and Vice News. In 2022, Ferdinando Buscema noted that "Horowitz is among the most articulate and respected voices in the contemporary occulture scene."

Works and scholarship 
Horowitz is the author of Occult America: The Secret History of How Mysticism Shaped Our Nation (Bantam, 2009/2010). The book received the 2010 PEN Oakland/ Josephine Miles Award.

Horowitz hosted, co-wrote, and produced the 2022 documentary The Kybalion, directed by Ronni Thomas and shot on location in Egypt. He also appeared on seasons I and II of Shudder’s Cursed Films on AMC+, a selection of SXSW 2020. 
 
Horowitz plays a newscaster in the forthcoming Paramount feature film My Animal, directed by Jacqueline Castel, a selection of the 2023 Sundance Film Festival.

Horowitz's writing has appeared in Gnosis: Journal of Gnostic Studies, Parabola, Esopus, Fortean Times, and with the Religion News Service.

Horowitz has called attention to the worldwide problem of violence against accused witches, helping draw notice to the human rights element of the issue.

In 2009, Horowitz was on the faculty of the urban holistic learning center, the New York City Open Center, for its annual Esoteric Quest. He presented lectures at the Open Center entitled The Psychic Highway: New York’s 'Burned-Over District' and the Growth of Alternative Spirituality in America and Made in America: The Hidden History of ‘Positive Thinking’.

At Tarcher/Penguin, Horowitz published titles in world religion, esoterica, and the metaphysical, as well as works in philosophy, social thought and politics, including Catching the Big Fish: Meditation, Consciousness, and Creativity by director David Lynch, 2012: The Return of Quetzalcoatl by Daniel Pinchbeck and Weapons of Mass Deception: The Uses of Propaganda in Bush’s War on Iraq by Sheldon Rampton and John Stauber. He has published a number of works by religious scholar Jacob Needleman, including The American Soul: Rediscovering the Wisdom of the Founders and the What is God?

Personal life 
Horowitz has two sons and lives in New York City.

Bibliography
 Uncertain Places: Essays on Occult and Outsider Experiences (2022)
 Daydream Believer: Unlocking the Ultimate Power of Your Mind (2022)
 The Miracle Club: How Thoughts Become Reality (2018)
 Mind as Builder: The Positive-Mind Metaphysics of Edgar Cayce (2017)
 One Simple Idea: How Positive Thinking Reshaped Modern Life (2014)
 Occult America: The Secret History of How Mysticism Shaped Our Nation (2009)

References

External links
 

American occult writers
Living people
1965 births
PEN Oakland/Josephine Miles Literary Award winners